Lynnville may refer to:

Canada
Lynnville, Ontario

United States
Lynnville, Illinois
Lynnville Township, Ogle County, Illinois 
Lynnville, Indiana 
Lynnville, Iowa 
Lynnville, Kentucky
Lynnville, Tennessee